KCNT (88.1 FM) is a radio station broadcasting a contemporary hit radio format. Licensed to Hastings, Nebraska, United States, the station serves the Hastings area.  The station is currently owned by Central Community College.

References

External links

CNT
Contemporary hit radio stations in the United States